Marino Zorzi or Marino Giorgi (died 1631) was a Roman Catholic prelate who served as Bishop of Brescia (1596–1631) 
and Apostolic Nuncio to Florence (1592–1596).

Biography
On 27 February 1592, Marino Zorzi was appointed during the papacy of Pope Clement VIII as Apostolic Nuncio to Florence.
On 4 March 1596, he was appointed during the papacy of Pope Clement VIII as Bishop of Brescia.
On 26 October 1596, he resigned as Apostolic Nuncio to Florence.
He served as Bishop of Brescia until his death on 28 August 1631.

See also 
Catholic Church in Italy

References

External links and additional sources
 (for Chronology of Bishops) 
  (for Chronology of Bishops) 
  (for Chronology of Bishops) 

16th-century Roman Catholic bishops in the Republic of Venice
Bishops appointed by Pope Clement VIII
1631 deaths
17th-century Roman Catholic bishops in the Republic of Venice